The Mount Lyell Standard was a Queenstown based newspaper in Western Tasmania, that was contemporaneous with the Zeehan and Dundas Herald. It was also known as the  Mount Lyell Standard & Strahan gazette.  The newspaper operated between 1896 and 1902.

The newspaper was quoted about developments in the mining operations in other newspapers.  The newspaper was involved in court actions in 1902 and 1903.

Editorial banners included Shakespearean quotes - such as:

It was notable for carrying material related to the early Australian politician King O'Malley.

Extracts from the paper, which was being published at a very busy time on the west coast, have been reprinted at various stages to reflect the conditions of the community.

References

Further reading
Miller, E. Morris (1953) A Historical Summary of Tasmanian Newspapers, Tasmanian Historical Research Association, Papers and Proceedings, vol.2, no.2, March 1953

Queenstown, Tasmania
1896 establishments in Australia
1902 disestablishments in Australia
Defunct newspapers published in Tasmania